Hryhoriy (Haranyan) Sakhnyuk (born 11 January 1987) is a professional and international Ukrainian football defender who plays in the Ukrainian Premier League. Sakhnyuk is also a member of the Ukrainian Ukrainian national under-21 football team.

External links 
 Profile at FFU website
 Official Website Profile
 Profile on Football Squads

1987 births
Living people
Ukrainian footballers
FC Kryvbas Kryvyi Rih players
FC CSKA Kyiv players
Ukrainian Premier League players
Association football defenders